Zeiraphera diniana, also known by its common name in Japan, the douglas fir cone moth, is a species of moth belonging to the family Tortricidae. The species is considered to be invasive, and is considered a pest of Larix decidua, as caterpillars defoliate the trees.

References

External links 
 Invasive Species Compendium at CABI

Eucosmini
Moths described in 1845